Carla Lucero (born 26 October 1990) is an inactive Argentine tennis player.

Lucero has a career-high WTA singles ranking of 371, achieved on 7 June 2010. She has won one singles title and seven ITF doubles titles at tournaments of the ITF Women's Circuit.

Lucero made her Fed Cup debut for Argentina in 2019. She lost her doubles match, which has been her single team participation.

ITF Circuit finals

Singles: 13 (1 title, 12 runner–ups)

Doubles: 20 (7 titles, 13 runner–ups)

References

External links
 
 
 
 

1990 births
Living people
Argentine female tennis players
21st-century Argentine women